Syracuse is a village in Meigs County, Ohio, United States, along the Ohio River. The population was 826 at the 2010 census.

Geography
Syracuse is located at  (38.999757, -81.972829).

Demographics

2010 census
As of the census of 2010, there were 826 people, 360 households, and 248 families living in the village. The racial makeup of the village was 97.2% White, 0.8% African American, 0.4% Native American, 0.1% Asian, and 1.5% from two or more races. Hispanic or Latino of any race were 0.1% of the population.

There were 360 households, of which 29.4% had children under the age of 18 living with them, 49.2% were married couples living together, 13.9% had a female householder with no husband present, 5.8% had a male householder with no wife present, and 31.1% were non-families. 28.3% of all households were made up of individuals, and 14.7% had someone living alone who was 65 years of age or older. The average household size was 2.29 and the average family size was 2.75.

The median age in the village was 45.8 years. 20.3% of residents were under the age of 18; 7.1% were between the ages of 18 and 24; 21.4% were from 25 to 44; 29.3% were from 45 to 64; and 21.8% were 65 years of age or older. The gender makeup of the village was 47.6% male and 52.4% female.

2000 census
As of the census of 2000, there were 879 people, 382 households, and 258 families living in the village. The population density was 952.8 people per square mile (368.9/km). There were 423 housing units at an average density of 458.5 per square mile (177.5/km). The racial makeup of the village was 97.84% White, 0.91% African American, 0.23% Native American, and 1.02% from two or more races. Hispanic or Latino of any race were 0.11% of the population.

There were 382 households, out of which 23.6% had children under the age of 18 living with them, 56.0% were married couples living together, 9.2% had a female householder with no husband present, and 32.2% were non-families. 28.8% of all households were made up of individuals, and 17.8% had someone living alone who was 65 years of age or older. The average household size was 2.30 and the average family size was 2.82.

In the village, the population was spread out, with 19.8% under the age of 18, 7.6% from 18 to 24, 24.6% from 25 to 44, 27.9% from 45 to 64, and 20.1% who were 65 years of age or older. The median age was 44 years. For every 100 females, there were 92.8 males. For every 100 females age 18 and over, there were 88.0 males.

The median income for a household in the village was $29,423, and the median income for a family was $37,813. Males had a median income of $41,389 versus $18,750 for females. The per capita income for the village was $19,279. About 11.8% of families and 15.5% of the population were below the poverty line, including 28.4% of those under age 18 and 8.0% of those age 65 or over.

Education
Public education in the village of Syracuse is provided by the Southern Local School District. Campuses serving the village include Southern Elementary School (Grades K-8) and Southern High School (Grades 9-12).

See also
 List of cities and towns along the Ohio River

Notable person
Rollie Hemsley, baseball player

References

Villages in Meigs County, Ohio
Villages in Ohio
Ohio populated places on the Ohio River